Beta function may refer to:
Beta function (physics), details the running of the coupling strengths
Dirichlet beta function, closely related to the Riemann zeta function
Beta function, also called the Euler beta function or the Euler integral of the first kind
Gödel's β function, used in mathematical logic to encode sequences of natural numbers
Beta function (accelerator physics), related to the transverse beam size at a given point in a beam transport system

See also:
Beta distribution